is a Japanese basketball coach. He coached the Japanese women's national team at the 2016 Summer Olympics, where the team finished eighth.

Personal
His son, Shingo Utsumi is a professional basketball player for the Kyoto Hannaryz.

Head coaching record

|-
| style="text-align:left;"|Levanga Hokkaido
| style="text-align:left;"|2018-19
|41||6||35|||| style="text-align:center;"|6th in Eastern|||-||-||-||
| style="text-align:center;"|-
|-
| style="text-align:left;"|Levanga Hokkaido
| style="text-align:left;"|2019-20
|40||13||27|||| style="text-align:center;"|6th in Eastern|||-||-||-||
| style="text-align:center;"|-
|-

References

Living people
Japanese basketball coaches
Japanese women's basketball coaches
Levanga Hokkaido coaches
1958 births
People from Misawa, Aomori